Ksis is a Brazilian pop/rock singer duo composed of identical twin sisters, Keyla and Kenya Boaventura (b. 1982, Minas Gerais, Brazil).

Discography
Their debut album, entitled Ksis, was released in Brazil on 18 October 2005 by EMI International music label.  To date, three singles have been released: "Tem Dias", "Beijos, Blues e Poesia" and "Reflexões no Espelho".

Television
In 2006 the sisters became VJ's on MTV Brasil. Currently Keyla and Kênya host Disk MTV (Brazilian version for TRL).

Brazilian rock music groups
Musical groups established in 2005
Twin musical duos
Brazilian musical duos
2005 establishments in Brazil
Identical twin females
Female musical duos